Carlos Salem Sola (born 1959 in Buenos Aires) is an Argentinian writer. He has lived in Spain since 1988, where he has worked for publications such as 
 El Faro de Ceuta ,  El Telegrama  or  El Faro de Melilla.

Works

Novels 
 Camino de ida (2007, Salto de Página)
 Matar y guardar la ropa (2008, Salto de Página)
 Pero sigo siendo el rey (2009, Salto de Página)
 Cracovia sin ti (2010, Imagine Ediciones)
 Un jamón calibre 45 (2011, RBA)
 El huevo izquierdo del talento (una novela de cerveza-ficción) (2013, ediciones Escalera)
 La maldición del tigre blanco (2013, Edebé)
 Muerto el perro (2014, Navona)

Tales
 Yo también puedo escribir una jodida historia de amor (2008, ediciones Escalera)
 Yo lloré con Terminator 2 (relatos de cerveza-ficción) (2009, ediciones Escalera)

Poetry 
 Si dios me pide un bloody mary (2008, ed. Ya lo dijo Casimiro Parker)
 Orgía de andar por casa (2009, Albatros)
 Memorias circulares del hombre-peonza (2010, ed. Ya lo dijo Casimiro Parker)

Theatre
 El torturador arrepentido (2011, Talentura)

Prizes 
 Memorial Silverio Cañada de la Semana Negra de Gijón
 Premio Novelpol a la mejor novela policial
 Premio internacional Seseña de Novela

References

External links 
  http://www.elhuevoizquierdodeltalento.blogspot.com Blog El huevo izquierdo del talento]
  Blog Matar y guardar la ropa

1959 births
Living people
Argentine male writers
Writers from Buenos Aires